In filtering theory the Zakai equation is a linear stochastic partial differential equation for the un-normalized density of a hidden state.  In contrast, the Kushner equation gives a non-linear stochastic partial differential equation for the normalized density of the hidden state.  In principle either approach allows one to estimate a quantity function (the state of a dynamical system) from noisy measurements, even when the system is non-linear (thus generalizing the earlier results of Wiener and Kalman for linear systems and solving a central problem in estimation theory).  The application of this approach to a specific engineering situation may be problematic however, as these equations are quite complex. The Zakai equation is a bilinear stochastic partial differential equation. It was named after Moshe Zakai.


Overview 

Assume the state of the system evolves according to

and a noisy measurement of the system state is available:

where  are independent Wiener processes. Then the unnormalized conditional probability density  of the state at time t is given by the Zakai equation:

where the operator 

As previously mentioned,  is an unnormalized density and thus does not necessarily integrate to 1.

Note that if the last term on the right hand side is omitted (by choosing h identically zero), the result is a nonstochastic PDE: the familiar Fokker–Planck equation, which describes the evolution of the state when no measurement information is available.

See also 

Kushner equation
Kalman filter
Wiener filter

References

Further reading 
 
 

Signal estimation
Stochastic differential equations